Heymeric de Campo (1395–1460) was a Dutch theologian and scholastic philosopher. He was a prominent Albertist, and forerunner of Nicholas of Cusa. He studied at the University of Paris, and taught at Cologne (where Nicholas studied under him), and Leuven.

His Tractatus Problematicus began a series of polemical exchanges between the Albertists and the Thomists. The first part deals with universals, following closely John de Nova Domo, Heymeric's teacher. A belated reply was made on behalf of the Thomists by Gerard de Monte.

He wrote a commentary on the Apocalypse, saw the Church as an organism, growing over time from one constitutional form to another.

References
Maarten Hoenen, Academics and Intellectual Life in the Low Countries: The University Career of Heymeric de Campo (†1460), Recherches de théologie ancienne et médiévale 61 (1994), 173–209
Hoenen, Denys the Carthusian and Heymeric de Campo on the Pilgrimages of Children to Mont-Saint-Michel (1458), Archives d'histoire doctrinale et littéraire du moyen âge 61 (1994), 387–418
Anna Fredriksson Adman (2003), Heymericus de Campo: Dyalogus Super Reuelacionibus Beate Birgitte: A Critical Edition with an Introduction
Florian Hamann (2006), Das Siegel der Ewigkeit. Universalwissenschaft und Konziliarismus bei Heymericus de Campo
Andrea Fiamma (2016), Nicola Cusano ed Eimerico da Campo: gli anni coloniensi, Medioevo. Rivista di storia della filosofia medievale 41 (2016), 217-257
 Cecilia Rusconi, / Klaus Reinhardt (2009): "Die dem Cusanus zugeschriebenen Glossen zu den Theoremata totius universi fundamentaliter doctrinalia des Heymericus de Campo“, in: Reinhardt, K., Schwaetzer, H., Stammkötter, F.-B. (Hrsg.), Heymericus de Campo. Philosophie und Theologie im 15. Jahrhundert, Roderer, Regensburg, 53-75. 
Cecilia Rusconi / Klaus Reinhardt  † (2018), "Heymericus de Campo: Tractatus de philosophica interpretatione Sacrae Scripturae" Corpus Christianorum Continuatio Mediaevalis 292A.

Notes

1395 births
1460 deaths
15th-century Dutch Roman Catholic theologians
Scholastic philosophers
Academic staff of the University of Cologne
Academic staff of the Old University of Leuven
University of Paris alumni
Dutch expatriates in France